Anb, Anb, AnB, ANb, or ANB may refer to:
 Anb, a village in Syria
 Alaska Native Brotherhood/Sisterhood, advocacy group for natives of Alaska
 Tomb ANB, an ancient Egyptian burial tomb
 Agoraphobic Nosebleed, an American cybergrind band
 ANB, IATA airport code for Anniston Metropolitan Airport, Alabama, United States
 ANB Futbol, a Canadian soccer team 
 American National Biography, a biographical encyclopedia
 Agencija za Nacionalnu Bezbjednost (National Security Agency (Montenegro)), Montenegrin intelligence agency
 Avisenes Nyhetsbyrå, a Norwegian press agency
 Amarillo National Bank, the largest bank in Amarillo, Texas
 Assyrian National Broadcasting, an Assyrian television station based in San Jose
 Athletics New Brunswick, the organizing body for athletics in New Brunswick, Canada
 Ambulance New Brunswick, provincial ambulance services in New Brunswick, Canada